is a Japanese international rugby union player who plays as a prop.   He currently plays for Yamaha Júbilo in Japan's domestic Top League.

Club career

Nakatani is a long term member of the Yamaha Júbilo club.

International

At the age of 35, Nakatani received his first call-up to Japan's senior squad ahead of the 2016 end-of-year rugby union internationals.

References

1981 births
Living people
Japanese rugby union players
Japan international rugby union players
Rugby union props
Shizuoka Blue Revs players
People from Takatsuki, Osaka
Ritsumeikan University alumni